Machilipatnam (rural) is a village in Krishna district of the Indian state of Andhra Pradesh. It is located on the coast of Bay of Bengal in Machilipatnam mandal of Machilipatnam revenue division.

Demographics 
At the 2011 Census of India, Machilipatnam (rural) had a population of 570 (285 males and 285 females, a sex ratio of 1,000 females per 1,000 males). 52 children were in the age group of 0–6 years (28 boys and 24 girls, a ratio of 857 per 1,000). The average literacy rate stands at 81.08% with 420 literates, significantly higher than the state average of 67.41%.

References

Villages in Krishna district